Trichotheliaceae is a family of lichen-forming fungi in the order Gyalectales. The family was circumscribed by Friedrich von Schilling and Friedrich August Georg Bitter in 1927.

In a recent (2018) molecular phylogenetic analysis, Trichotheliaceae was shown to be part of a monophyletic clade containing the families Coenogoniaceae, Gyalectaceae, Phlyctidaceae, and Sagiolechiaceae.

Genera
According to a recent (2022) survey of fungal classification, Trichotheliaceae contains eight genera and about 365 species. The following list indicates the genus name, the taxonomic authority, year of publication, and the number of species:
Clathroporina  – ca. 25
Flabelloporina  – 1 sp.
Myeloconis  – 4 spp.
Porina  – ca. 145 spp.
Pseudosagedia  – 80 spp.
Saxiloba  – 2 spp.
Segestria  – 70 spp.
Trichothelium  – 40 spp.

References

Gyalectales
Lecanoromycetes families
Taxa described in 1927
Lichen families